Lee A. Tonouchi (born circa 1972) is a Hawaii-born writer and editor, who calls himself "Da Pidgin Guerilla" because of his strong advocacy of the Hawaiian Pidgin language.

Tonouchi graduated from Aiea High School in 1990.
He promotes the idea that Hawaiian Pidgin is an appropriate language for both creative and academic writing.
He was inspired by the works of Eric Chock in the journal Bamboo Ridge.
All of his writing, including his Master's Thesis, is in Pidgin.  He was an instructor of English at Kapiolani Community College in 2007.
He also taught at Hawaii Pacific University during 2005,
and later.
His works often address family relationship in a humorous way.

His principal works:
 Hybolics (1999), literary magazine in Hawaiian Pidgin (co-editor)
 Da Word (2001), a collection of short stories
 Living Pidgin: Contemplations on Pidgin Culture (2002), a collection of poems and essays
 Gone Feeshing (2004), a play first produced at Kumu Kahua Theatre
 Da Kine Dictionary:Da Hawai'i Community Pidgin Dictionary Projeck (2005), a dictionary of Hawaiian Pidgin

References

Living people
American writers of Japanese descent
Poets from Hawaii
American male poets
1970s births
American poets
American poets of Asian descent